The 2016 Hockenheimring GP3 Series round was a GP2 Series motor race held on 30 and 31 July 2016 at the Hockenheimring in Germany. It was the fiventh round of the 2016 GP3 Series. The race weekend supported the 2016 German Grand Prix.

Classification

Qualifying
Alexander Albon secured his second pole position of the season with a time of 1:28.431 - marginally faster than that of Charles Leclerc, Jake Dennis and Nyck de Vries.

Race 1
Antonio Fuoco took his second win of the year. de Vries achieved second and Matt Parry in third.

Race 2
Jake Hughes took his first win of the season, with Jack Aitken in second and Charles Leclerc in third. Championship leader Alexander Albon retired after an accident with Ralph Boschung in the opening laps which subsequently promoted Leclerc into the lead of the championship.

Standings after the round

Drivers' Championship standings

Teams' Championship standings

 Note: Only the top five positions are included for both sets of standings.

See also 
 2016 German Grand Prix
 2016 Hockenheimring GP2 Series round

References

External links 
 Official website of GP3 Series

|- style="text-align:center"
|width="35%"|Previous race:
|width="30%"|GP3 Series2016 season
|width="40%"|Next race:

GP3
Hockenheimring
Hockenheimring